Simon Curtis may refer to:

Simon Curtis (actor), American actor, singer-songwriter, and record producer
Simon Curtis (filmmaker), British film director and producer
Simon John Curtis, British farrier, author and lecturer
Simon Curtis (author), British author and educationalist